Line 5 is a southwest–northeast line of Suzhou Rail Transit. It opened on June 29, 2021. The line is 44.1 kilometers long. Its south-western terminus is at Taihu Xiangshan station in Wuzhong District, with its north-eastern terminus at Yangchenghu South station in Suzhou Industrial Park.

50 six car type B fully automated subway trains were ordered for the line.

Stations

References

Suzhou Rail Transit lines
Railway lines opened in 2021